Inverness is a historic plantation house and national historic district located near Burkeville, Nottoway County, Virginia. In its present form the house is a five-bay, two story, gable-roofed, "L"-shaped frame-and-weatherboard I-house set above a high basement, with exterior end chimneys. The original section of the house was built about 1800, and raised to two stories in the early-19th century. A large, two-story, two-room wing was added about 1845, forming the "L"-shape. Around 1895 a crude, two-story kitchen wing, was attached to the 1845 wing, and side porches were added.  A Classical Revival monumental portico with four Doric order columns and a small second-floor balcony, was installed across the three center bays of the front facade about 1907. Also on the property are a contributing 20th century frame and cement-block dairy barn, and a 20th-century frame milk shed.

It was listed on the National Register of Historic Places in 1999.

References

Plantation houses in Virginia
Houses on the National Register of Historic Places in Virginia
Historic districts on the National Register of Historic Places in Virginia
Neoclassical architecture in Virginia
Houses completed in 1800
Houses in Nottoway County, Virginia
National Register of Historic Places in Nottoway County, Virginia